Heiligenstadt station could refer to the following:

 Heilbad Heiligenstadt station in Heilbad Heiligenstadt, Thuringia, Germany
 Heiligenstadt station (Vienna U-Bahn) in Vienna, Austria
 Wien Heiligenstadt railway station in Vienna, Austria